Liam Stocker (born 23 January 2000) is an Australian rules footballer who plays for the St Kilda Football Club in the Australian Football League (AFL), having initially been drafted to the Carlton Football Club. He was recruited with the 19th overall selection in the 2018 National Draft and was the first player to be drafted via a 'live trade'. Liam is from Victoria, and played for the Sandringham Dragons in the TAC Cup before being picked to represent Vic Metro at the 2018 AFL Under 18 Championships.

Early life and junior career 
Liam was born in Camperdown, New South Wales, Australia. His family moved to Beijing, China when Liam was 4 after his dad was given a job opportunity. Liam lived there until moving back to Australia at Sandringham, Victoria when he was 10. He completed his schooling in 2017 at Haileybury College.

Liam played for the Sandringham Dragons in the TAC Cup. In 2018, he had a standout season, averaging 22 disposals, 13 contested possessions, and 5 clearances. What stood out to a lot of people was his endurance, professionalism and ability to kick the ball well on both feet. He was awarded the Morrish Medal, the best and fairest award for the TAC Cup, but sustained a jaw injury which saw him miss the AFL Under 18 Championships. Nevertheless, he was still chosen by Vic Metro as one of their top prospects for the draft. A shoulder injury struck again and he missed the combine, leading him to admit that he 'had plans to TAC Cup footy next year'.

AFL career 
His recruitment made national headlines as he was the first player to be picked using the then-new system allowing draft picks to be traded live during draft night: Carlton made a live trade with the Adelaide Crows which saw the Blues receive Stocker's pick in exchange for the two clubs exchanging their first round picks in the following season's draft. For the early part of Stocker's debut season, the bold decision looked likely to backfire badly, and as late as Round 13, Adelaide was sitting in the top four while Carlton was on the bottom of the ladder, opening the possibility that it would lose the 2019 No. 1 selection for a low first-round pick; however, stronger end-of-season form saw it rise to 16th, and Adelaide lost seven of its last nine games to fall to 11th, such that in the end Carlton had traded pick No. 4 for Stocker and pick No. 9 (which in turn traded for the picks which secured Brodie Kemp and Sam Philp).

He signed a 3-year contract keeping him at the club until 2022. He did not play a senior match in the COVID-19 pandemic-interrupted 2020 season – ruling himself out after electing to return to Victoria when the club was forced to spend much of the season living on the Gold Coast to avoid interstate travel restrictions associated with the pandemic. Stocker had his most successful season in 2021, playing 17 of 22 games; but, after being selected for only six matches in 2022, he was delisted at the end of the season.

Stocker then joined  as a rookie during the supplemental selection period (SSP) ahead of the 2023 AFL season.

Player profile 
An inside midfielder, Stocker's main qualities are his frame and his knack for getting the ball out of contests. Adept at kicking the ball on both feet, Stocker is also a scoreboard threat, using his versatility to attack the opposition around most of the playing area. Averaging 4 tackles in the TAC Cup and 5 clearances, he showed his grunt useful on the inside of contests along with his class on the outside.

References

External links 
 
 
 
 Liam Stocker's playing statistics from the TAC Cup on SportsTG
 Liam Stocker's profile in Blueseum

2000 births
Living people
Carlton Football Club players
Australian rules footballers from Melbourne
Sandringham Dragons players
Preston Football Club (VFA) players
People from Sandringham, Victoria
People educated at Haileybury (Melbourne)